Weems Creek is a stream in the U.S. state of Maryland. It is a tributary to the Severn River.

Weems Creek is named after the Weems family, which settled near its course in the 1780s. A variant name is "Weem Creek".

References

Rivers of Anne Arundel County, Maryland